Eagris denuba, the cream flat, is a species of butterfly in the family Hesperiidae. It is found in Senegal, Guinea, Sierra Leone, Liberia, Ivory Coast, Ghana, Togo, Nigeria, Cameroon, Sudan and Ethiopia. The habitat consists of forests.

Adults of both sexes are attracted to flowers and males feed from bird droppings and occasionally mud-puddle.

Subspecies
Eagris denuba denuba - Senegal, Guinea, Sierra Leone, Liberia, Ivory Coast, Ghana, Togo, Nigeria, western Cameroon
Eagris denuba obliterata Carpenter, 1928 - southern Sudan, Ethiopia

References

Butterflies described in 1879
Tagiadini
Butterflies of Africa